WHT may stand for:

Walsh–Hadamard transform
Westmoreland Heritage Trail, a rail trail  in Pennsylvania
Whitchurch railway station (Wales), Cardiff, Wales (National Rail station code)
White coat hypertension, the phenomenon where people exhibit hypertension in a clinical setting, although they do not exhibit it in other settings
William Herschel Telescope, a  telescope located on the island of La Palma
William Howard Taft (1857–1930), 27th president and 10th chief justice of the United States
Withholding tax, a tax deducted at the source
Wometco Home Theater, a short-lived over-the-air subscription television service
World Harvest Television, a channel from television network Family Broadcasting Corporation